Glenn Parker (November 25, 1898 – April 18, 1989) was an American jurist who served as a justice of the Wyoming Supreme Court from December 5, 1955, to January 6, 1975.

Career 
Parker was born in Murray, Iowa, to Charles Theron Parker (1851–1932) and Mary Lavanchie Ball (1873–1958). He grew up with his family on a farm near Sheridan, Wyoming. Parker attended the University of Wyoming where, in 1922, he earned a Bachelor of Arts degree, and in 1924, a law degree. Between the time he received his bachelor's degree and his return to law school, he taught school in Laramie and Casper. Parker served in the U.S. Army in World Wars I and II and rose to the rank of colonel.

Parker was admitted to the Wyoming State Bar in 1927 and practiced law in Laramie. In addition to his private practice, he served as city attorney for two years and county attorney for eight years (1932-1940). From 1949 to 1955, he served as a Wyoming state district court judge in the Second Judicial District (Albany County in Laramie).

In 1955, Governor Milward Simpson appointed him to the Wyoming Supreme Court to fill a vacancy caused by the death of Chief Justice William Addison Riner (1878–1955). Parker had been endorsed for the position by the Albany, Carbon, and Sweetwater County Bar Associations. Parker was chief justice from January 1, 1963, to January 2, 1967, and from January 1, 1973, to January 2, 1975. He was the first graduate of the University of Wyoming College of Law to become a state district judge and also the first to serve on the Wyoming Supreme Court. After his retirement in 1975, Parker was associated with the Cheyenne law firm, Hirst and Applegate.

During his legal career, Parker served as Wyoming chairman of the American Bar Association's Committee on Legal Education and Admissions to the Bar and was a member of the American Judicature Society and the American Law Institute. He was also a special lecturer-instructor at the University of Wyoming College of Law.

Family 
On June 8, 1924, Parker married, Ruth Beggs ( Lila Ruth Beggs; 1893–1971) in Denver (Weld County). Together, they had two children. After Ruth died, Parker, on October 7, 1972, married Sally Weitz ( Sarah Barbara Joyce; 1913–2016).

Death 
Parker died April 18, 1989, in Cheyenne.

|-

Bibliography

Notes

References 

 

   . . .

   ; .

See also 

  ; ; .

Justices of the Wyoming Supreme Court
1898 births
1989 deaths
University of Wyoming alumni
People from Clarke County, Iowa
20th-century American judges